This is a chronological list of shootings committed by firearms in the state of New York which have a Wikipedia article for the shooting, the shooter, the victim, or a related subject.

See also
 List of shootings in California
 List of shootings in Colorado
 List of shootings in Florida
 List of shootings in Texas

New York (state)-related lists
Crime in New York (state)

Murder in New York (state)
New York State
New York State
Murder–suicides in New York City
Lists of shootings by location